This is a list of bridges and tunnels on the National Register of Historic Places in California.

List

References

 
 Bridges
California
Bridges
Bridges